Unsoeld is a surname. Notable people with the surname include:

 Jolene Unsoeld (1931–2021), American politician
 Willi Unsoeld (1926–1979), American mountaineer

See also
 Unseld (surname)
 Unsöld